Enstone Spark (foaled 6 June 1975) was a British-bred Thoroughbred racehorse. She is best known for winning the classic 1000 Guineas in 1978.

Racing career
Trained by Barry Hills, at age two, Enstone Spark won the 1977 Lowther Stakes at York Racecourse. In 1978, her Canadian owner, Dick Bonnycastle, was planning to ship Enstone Spark to race in California but an outbreak of contagious equine metritis forced a change of plans and she remained to compete in England.

In 1978 Enstone Spark earned the most important win of her career at Newmarket Racecourse with a victory in the Classic 1,000 Guineas Stakes. It came when she was still more than a month shy of her third birthday.

Stud record
Retired from racing a winner of five races with three second-place finishes in her two years of racing, Enstone Spark was assigned to broodmare duty. Bred to stallions such as Affirmed, Roberto, and Bold Forbes, her offspring were not successful in racing.

References

 Enstone Spark's pedigree and partial racing stats

1975 racehorse births
Racehorses bred in the United Kingdom
Racehorses trained in the United Kingdom
Thoroughbred family 1-d
1000 Guineas winners